In complex analysis, a branch of mathematics, a holomorphic function is said to be of exponential type C if its growth is bounded by the exponential function eC|z| for some real-valued constant C as |z| → ∞.  When a function is bounded in this way, it is then possible to express it as certain kinds of convergent summations over a series of other complex functions, as well as understanding when it is possible to apply techniques such as Borel summation, or, for example, to apply the Mellin transform, or to perform approximations using the Euler–Maclaurin formula.  The general case is handled by Nachbin's theorem, which defines the analogous notion of Ψ-type for a general function Ψ(z) as opposed to ez.

Basic idea

A function f(z) defined on the complex plane is said to be of exponential type if there exist real-valued constants M and τ such that

Letting τ stand for the infimum of all such τ, one then says that the function f is of exponential type τ.

For example, let . Then one says that  is of exponential type π, since π is the smallest number that bounds the growth of  along the imaginary axis. So, for this example, Carlson's theorem cannot apply, as it requires functions of exponential type less than π. Similarly, the Euler–Maclaurin formula cannot be applied either, as it, too, expresses a theorem ultimately anchored in the theory of finite differences.

Formal definition
A holomorphic function  is said to be of exponential type  if for every  there exists a real-valued constant  such that

for  where .
The number

The limit superior here means the limit of the supremum of the ratio outside a given radius as the radius goes to infinity. This is also the limit superior of the maximum of the ratio at a given radius as the radius goes to infinity. The limit superior may exist even if the maximum at radius r does not have a limit as r goes to infinity. For example, for the function

the value of

and this goes to zero as n goes to infinity, but F(z) is nevertheless of exponential type 1, as can be seen by looking at the points .

Exponential type with respect to a symmetric convex body

 has given a generalization of exponential type for entire functions of several complex variables. 
It is known that for every such  there is an associated norm  with the property that

The set

Furthermore, we can write

An entire function  of -complex variables is said to be of exponential type with respect to  if for every  there exists a real-valued constant  such that

for all .

Fréchet space
Collections of functions of exponential type  can form a complete uniform space, namely a Fréchet space, by the topology induced by the countable family of norms

See also
Paley–Wiener theorem
Paley–Wiener space

References 

 

Complex analysis